The Torneo Guardianes 2021 (stylized as Guard1anes) Liga MX final phase was played between 8 May 2021 to 30 May 2021. A total of 12 teams competed in the final phase to decide the champions of the Guardianes 2021 Liga MX season. For the second straight season, an additional qualifying round, the reclassification or repechaje, was employed, which expanded the number of playoff spots to 12.

Both finalists qualified to the 2022 CONCACAF Champions League.

Qualified teams
The following teams qualified for the championship stage.

In the following tables, the number of appearances, last appearance, and previous best result count only those in the short tournament era starting from Invierno 1996 (not counting those in the long tournament era from 1943–44 to 1995–96).

Format

Reclassification
All rounds will be played in a single-leg hosted by the higher seed
If a game ends in a draw, it will proceed directly to a penalty shoot-out.

Liguilla
Teams are re-seeded each round.
The winners of the Reclassification matches are seeded based on their ranking in the classification table.
Team with more goals on aggregate after two matches advance.
Away goals rule is applied in the quarter-finals and semi-finals, but not the final.
In the quarter-finals and semi-finals, if the two teams are tied on aggregate and away goals, the higher seeded team advances.
In the final, if the two teams are tied after both legs, the match will go to extra time and, if necessary, a shoot-out.
Both finalists will qualify to the 2022 CONCACAF Champions League.

Reclassification

Summary
Matches took place on 8–9 May 2021.

|}

Matches

Seeding
The following was the final seeding for the final phase. The winners of the Reclassification matches were seeded based on their position in the classification table.

Bracket

Quarter-finals

Summary
The first legs were played on 12–13 May, and the second legs were played on 15–16 May.

|}

Matches

First leg

Second leg

1–1 on aggregate. Puebla advanced due to being the higher seed in the classification table.

Cruz Azul won 4–3 on aggregate.

Santos Laguna won 3–2 on aggregate.

5–5 on aggregate. Pachuca won on away goals.

Semi-finals

Summary
The first legs will be played on 19–20 May, and the second legs will be played on 22–23 May.

|}

Matches

First leg

Second leg

Cruz Azul won 1–0 on aggregate.

Santos Laguna won 3–1 on aggregate.

Finals

Summary
The first leg was played on 27 May, and the second leg was played on 30 May.

|}

Matches

First leg

Details

Statistics

Second leg

Cruz Azul won 2–1 on aggregate.

Details

Statistics

Statistics

Goalscorers

Assists

Notes

References

 
1
Liga MX seasons